Río Hondo (Spanish for "deep river") or Hondo River may refer to:

Rivers
Rio Hondo (Belize), a river which forms much of the border between Belize and Mexico
Hondo River (Comerío, Puerto Rico)
Hondo River (Hormigueros, Puerto Rico)
Rio Hondo (California), a tributary of the Los Angeles River in California, U.S.
Rio Hondo College, a college named after the California river
Rio Hondo (Northern New Mexico), a river in the northern part of New Mexico, U.S.
Rio Hondo (Southern New Mexico), a river in the southern part of New Mexico, U.S.
Rio Hondo (Louisiana), a stream in Natchitoches Parish, Louisiana, also known as Bayou Hondo, whose associated Rio Hondo lands, a Spanish land grant, included the Stoker House

Places
Termas de Río Hondo, a city in the Santiago del Estero province, Argentina
Rio Hondo, a barrio in Consolación del Sur, Cuba
Río Hondo, Zacapa, a municipality in Zacapa department, Guatemala
Río Hondo, Los Santos, a corregimiento in Panama
Rio Hondo, a barrio in Zamboanga City, Philippines
Rio Hondo, Texas, a township in Texas, U.S.